Glutamate carboxypeptidase (carboxypeptidase G, carboxypeptidase G1, carboxypeptidase G2, glutamyl carboxypeptidase, N-pteroyl-L-glutamate hydrolase) is an enzyme. This enzyme catalyses the following chemical reaction

 Release of C-terminal glutamate residues from a wide range of N-acylating moieties, including peptidyl, aminoacyl, benzoyl, benzyloxycarbonyl, folyl and pteroyl groups

This zinc enzyme is produced by pseudomonads, Flavobacterium sp. and Acinetobacter sp.

See also 
 Glutamate carboxypeptidase II

References

External links 
 

EC 3.4.17